Cargo is a Canadian drama film, directed by François Girard and released in 1990. Girard's feature film debut, the film centres on a sailing trip undertaken by Alice (Geneviève Rioux), her father Philippe (Michel Dumont) and her lover Marcel (Guy Thauvette). After they are caught in a violent storm which kills Philippe but from which Alice and Marcel are rescued, Philippe is left alone wandering a ghost ship and struggling to make sense of his fate.

The film premiered in October 1990 at the Festival du nouveau cinéma.

Daniel Jobin received a Genie Award nomination for Best Cinematography at the 12th Genie Awards in 1991.

References

External links

1990 films
1990 drama films
Canadian drama films
Films directed by François Girard
Films shot in Quebec
1990s French-language films
French-language Canadian films
1990s Canadian films